Lyon-Vaise station (French: Gare de Lyon-Vaise) is a railway station in Lyon, located in the district of Vaise, in the 9th arrondissement. The station is on the historical Paris–Lyon–Marseille (PLM) main line; it is also served by Lyon Metro Line D of which it is the northwestern terminus.

History 
From 10 July 1854 until the opening of the Saint-Irenée tunnel between Vaise and Perrache railway station on 10 October 1856, the station was the Lyon terminus of trains from Chalon-sur-Saône and Paris.

Lyon-Vaise was destroyed during the bombings of 26 May 1944. It was provisionally rebuilt in wood, then a new station was opened in 1956. In 1997, a new multimodal space was built to facilitate connections between the train, metro and bus.

Services
The station is served by regional trains towards Mâcon, Nevers, Bourg-en-Bresse, Vienne and Roanne.

See also  
Transport in Rhône-Alpes
Lyon Metro

References

Lyon Metro stations
9th arrondissement of Lyon
Vaise
Railway stations in France opened in 1854